Sidney–Richland Municipal Airport  is a mile west of Sidney, in Richland County, Montana, United States. The airport is served by one airline, subsidized by the federal government's Essential Air Service program at a cost of $3,777,579 (per year).

The Federal Aviation Administration says this airport had 2,031 passenger boardings (enplanements) in calendar year 2008, 2,766 in 2009, and 3,659 in 2010. The National Plan of Integrated Airport Systems for 2011–2015 categorized it as a general aviation airport based on enplanements in 2008 (the commercial service category requires at least 2,500 enplanements per year).

Passenger air service past & present

Scheduled air service temporarily ceased on March 8, 2008, when Big Sky Airlines ended operations due to a bankruptcy. In 1985, Big Sky was operating nonstop flights into the airport from Billings and Williston, ND as an independent air carrier with Fairchild Swearingen Metroliner commuter propjets. By 1989, Big Sky was operating as a Northwest Airlink air carrier on behalf of Northwest Airlines via a code sharing agreement and was continuing to serve Sidney with nonstop Metroliner propjet flights from Billings and Williston. By the early 1990s, Big Sky was no longer operating as a Northwest Airlink air carrier but was continuing to serve the airport as an independent airline and by 1995 was operating nonstop Metroliner propjet flights to the airport from Billings and Glendive, MT.

Following cessation of service by Big Sky, Great Lakes Airlines was then given USDOT approval to take over federal Essential Air Service (EAS) flights and flights began in 2009. Between 2011 and 2013, service was provided under a federal EAS contract by Silver Airways (formerly Gulfstream International Airlines).

Effective December 10, 2013 passenger service between Sidney and Billings was initiated by Cape Air with small Cessna 402C twin prop aircraft with Cape Air continuing to serve the airport at the present time with five flights per day to Billings.

The first airline flights were operated by the original Frontier Airlines (1950-1986) with Douglas DC-3 aircraft commencing in September 1954.  By 1968, Combs Aviation, a commuter air carrier operating small Aero Commander 500 twin prop aircraft, was serving the airport on behalf of Frontier via a contract agreement following cessation of Frontier DC-3 flights; however, Frontier then returned to Sidney with de Havilland Canada DHC-6 Twin Otter commuter turboprop flights and continued to serve Sidney until 1980.  In 1977, Frontier was operating round trip Twin Otter service on a routing of Billings - Miles City, MT - Glendive, MT - Sidney - Williston, ND - Minot with connections at both Billings and Minot to and from Boeing 737-200 jet flights operated by Frontier. Big Sky Airlines then began serving the airport during the early 1980s primarily with Handley Page Jetstream and Fairchild Swearingen Metroliner commuter propjets with nonstop flights from Billings, Glendive and Williston.

Facilities
The airport covers 335 acres (136 ha) at an elevation of 1,985 feet (605 m). It has two asphalt runways: 1/19 is 5,705 by 100 feet (1,739 x 30 m) and 11/29 is 4,023 by 100 feet.

In 2009 the airport had 6,815 aircraft operations, average 18 per day: 59% general aviation, 26% airline, 15% air taxi, and <1% military. 32 aircraft were then based at the airport: 84% single-engine and 16% multi-engine.

Airline and destination 

Scheduled passenger airline:

Statistics

References

Other sources

 Essential Air Service documents (Docket DOT-OST-1997-2605) from the U.S. Department of Transportation:
 Order 2005-12-20 (December 30, 2005): selecting Big Sky Transportation Co., d/b/a Big Sky Airlines, to continue providing essential air service at seven Montana communities (Glasgow, Glendive, Havre, Lewistown, Miles City, Sidney, and Wolf Point) for a new two-year period beginning March 1, 2006, at a subsidy of $6,838,934 annually.
 Order 2007-11-21 (November 26, 2007): selecting Big Sky Transportation Co., d/b/a Big Sky Airlines, to continue providing essential air service at seven Montana communities for a new two-year period beginning March 1, 2008, at a subsidy of $8,473,617 annually.
 Order 2007-12-22 (December 21, 2007): allowing Big Sky Transportation Co., d/b/a Big Sky Airlines, to suspend its subsidized essential air services at seven Montana communities on the date that Great Lakes Aviation, Ltd., begins replacement service, and selecting Great Lakes to provide those services at subsidy rates totaling $8,201,992.
 Order 2008-7-9 (July 3, 2008): approving an alternate service pattern requested by Lewistown, Miles City and Sidney, Montana.
 Order 2011-1-27 (February 2, 2011): selecting Gulfstream International Airlines, to provide subsidized essential air service (EAS) with 19-passenger Beechcraft B-1900D aircraft at Glasgow, Glendive, Havre, Lewistown, Miles City, Sidney, and Wolf Point, Montana, for a two-year period beginning when the carrier inaugurates full EAS at all seven communities through the end of the 24th month thereafter (two-year period ended May 31, 2013), at a combined annual subsidy rate of $10,903,854. Aircraft: 19-passenger Beech 1900-D. Destination: Billings. The subsidy and level of service for each community is as follows: Lewistown $1,325,733 (12 nonstop round trips each week), Miles City: $1,621,821 (12 nonstop round trips each week), Sidney $2,932,152 (17 nonstop round trips each week), Havre $1,162,329 (12 one-stop round trips each week), Glendive $1,193,391 (12 one-stop round trips each week), Glasgow $1,166,049 (5 nonstop and 7 one-stop round trips each week), Wolf Point $1,502,378 (7 nonstop and 5 one-stop round trips each week).
 Notice (June 28, 2013): from Silver Airways of its intent to discontinue scheduled subsidized Essential Air Service between Glasgow, Glendive, Havre, Lewistown, Miles City, Sidney, Wolf Point, Montana and Billings, Montana. Commensurate with the end of subsidy eligibility, Silver Airways will end service to Lewistown and Miles City on July 15, 2013. Further, Silver Airways hereby serves 90-day notice of its intent to discontinue service to the communities of Glasgow, Glendive, Havre, Sidney and Wolf Point, Montana effective September 27, 2013.
 Order 2013-6-3 (June 4, 2013): extending the contract established under Order 2011-1-27, issued on February 3, 2011, for Silver Airways, Inc. (formerly Gulfstream International Airlines), to provide Essential Air Service (EAS) operations at Lewistown, Miles City, Glasgow, Glendive, Havre, Sidney, and Wolf Point, Montana, from June 1, 2013, until further notice.
 Order 2013-9-4 (September 5, 2013): selecting Hyannis Air Service, Inc., d/b/a Cape Air, to provide Essential Air Service (EAS) with 9-passenger Cessna 402 aircraft at Glasgow, Glendive, Havre, Sidney, and Wolf Point, Montana, for a two-year period beginning December 1, 2013, through November 30, 2015, at a combined annual subsidy of $11,950,426. The subsidy and level of service for each community is as follows: Glasgow $2,046,800 (2 trips per day), Glendive $1,944,467 (2 trips per day), Havre $2,036,254 (2 trips per day), Sidney $3,777,579 (5 trips per day), Wolf Point $2,145,326 (2 trips per day). Scheduled service: to Billings. Aircraft Type: Cessna 402 (9 passenger seats).
 Order 2013-12-1 (December 2, 2013): Cape Air will commence full EAS at all five of the above communities beginning December 10, 2013, thereby establishing an end date for this contract of December 31, 2015.

External links 
 http://www.sidneyherald.com/news/sidney-richland-airport-nears-milestone-mark-for-year/article_7a7b435c-17ec-11e2-acbc-001a4bcf887a.html
 
 

Airports in Montana
Buildings and structures in Richland County, Montana
Essential Air Service
Transportation in Richland County, Montana